UGC 5692 is a Magellanic-type spiral galaxy located 13 million light years away in the constellation of Ursa Major.  An alternate designation DDO 82 is named for the David Dunlap Observatory Catalogue. The galaxy was added to this list in 1959 by Sidney van den Bergh.

References

Dwarf spiral galaxies
Ursa Major (constellation)
030997
+12-10-045
05692